Henry Gore, 1st Baron Annaly (8 March 1728 – 5 June 1793) was an Anglo-Irish politician and peer. 

Gore was the third son of George Gore and Bridget Sankey. One of his elder brothers was John Gore, who was created Baron Annaly (first creation) in 1766.

Between 1758 and 1760, Gore was the Member of Parliament for Longford County in the Irish House of Commons. He then represented Lanesborough between 1761 and 1768, before sitting again for Longford County from 1768 and 1789. He was High Sheriff of Longford in 1765 and held the office of Examiner of Customs in 1770. On 23 September 1789, he was created Baron Annaly, of Tenelick in the Peerage of Ireland, a revival of the title created for his deceased brother, and assumed his seat in the Irish House of Lords.

He married Mary Smyth, daughter of Skeffington Randal Smyth and Mary Moore, on 4 August 1764. He died without children in 1793, at which point his title became extinct.

References

1728 births
1793 deaths
18th-century Anglo-Irish people
Barons in the Peerage of Ireland
Henry
High Sheriffs of Longford
Irish MPs 1727–1760
Irish MPs 1761–1768
Irish MPs 1769–1776
Irish MPs 1776–1783
Irish MPs 1783–1790
Members of the Parliament of Ireland (pre-1801) for County Longford constituencies
Peers of Ireland created by George III